Vena amoris is a Latin name meaning, literally, "vein of love".  Traditional belief established that this vein ran directly from the  fourth finger of the left hand to the heart. This theory has been cited in Western cultures as one of the reasons the engagement ring and/or wedding ring was placed on the fourth finger, or "ring finger".

The earliest use of jewelry to signify a bonding was often chains and bracelets.  This evolved to the use of the symbolic ring. In ancient Egypt, the Sun and the Moon gods were feared and worshipped.  A ring was a symbol of these spirits, both of whom were also related to the home and hearth.  The endless circle showed the eternal nature of the bond, while the open centre was meant to be a doorway to things unknown.

This tradition was later assimilated by the Greeks, after Alexander the Great conquered Egypt in 332 BC. Up to this time betrothal rings were generally made out of hemp, leather, bone, or ivory.  In early Rome the use of metal rings gradually began to take over from these materials, and the metal of choice back then was iron.  Gold and silver rings were given on rare occasions, to prove that a man trusted his wife with his valuable property.

The earliest known occurrence of the phrase vena amoris was from Henry Swinburne, an English ecclesiastical lawyer whose work covering marriage, the puritanical "A Treatise of Espousal or Matrimonial Contracts", was published posthumously in 1686.  He cites unidentified ancient sources and purports an Egyptian connection; but no earlier mention of the vein can be found. Macrobius, in Saturnalia VII, 13 (a notably fictional work) refers to the connection between the ring finger and the heart, but implies in the one phrase a nerve rather than a vein, and in another implies more of a magical than physical significance to the choice of finger. The hand is not specified.  Of note, the circulatory system was unknown at the time. Another early reference, again not specifying the hand, was by Isidore of Seville in his 7th century work De ecclesiasticis officiis XX, 8, which refers to the Roman story of a vein connected to the heart.

The choice of finger is also less than settled until recent times; during the 17th century in England it was not unusual to wear the wedding ring on the thumb. Gauls and Britons wore their rings on the middle finger, and the choice of right or left hand appears relatively dependent on culture; though cultures that use either the right or left ring finger both claim a historical connection to the vena amoris.  The use of wedding and betrothal rings was not commonplace in the Roman Empire until the 2nd century; which also contradicts versions of the story which claim that this tradition was brought to Rome in the 3rd century BC.

The strong possibility exists, based on the lack of concrete sources, that this story is a combination of ancient beliefs in the mystical properties of the ring finger, smatterings of legend, and shrewd marketing by the jewellery industry, which has in the past demonstrated a willingness to exploit myths and legends to increase ring sales.

Notes

Marriage
Veins of the upper limb
Latin medical words and phrases
Wedding
Heart
Love